Three Kingdoms RPG is a 2012 Hong Kong television series produced by TVB, with Lau Kar-ho serving as the drama's executive producer. It stars Kenneth Ma as Szema Shun, a young Hong Kong game addict, who accidentally travels back in time to the Three Kingdoms period of Chinese history.

Plot
Vincent Szema (Kenneth Ma) is a game addict who goes back to the Three Kingdoms period, and meets many historical figures. He becomes Zhuge Liang's trusted advisor and utilized modern strategies to overcome issues and obstacles. Vincent then develops feelings for a female servant in the kingdom of Shu. Vincent was able to maintain contact with his sister through his smart phone and learned that the time warp would take place at the Battle of Chibi.

Cast
 Note: Some of the characters' names are in Cantonese romanisation.

Main cast
Kenneth Ma as Szema Shun (司馬信), a Hong Kong youth who accidentally travels back in time to the Three Kingdoms period.
Raymond Lam as Chugot Leung (諸葛亮), Liu Bei's strategist
Tavia Yeung as Song-yau (桑柔), a maid who serves Lau Bei's family. She becomes Shun's love interest.

Suk Hon (蜀漢)

Joseph Lee as Lau Bei (劉備), a warlord who founded Suk Hon
Au Sui-wai as Kwan Yu (關羽), a general under Lau Bei, second sworn brother to Lau Bei and Zhang Fei.
Savio Tsang as Cheung Fei (張飛), a general under Lau Bei, third sworn brother to Lau Bei and Guan Yu.
Deno Cheung as Chiu Wan (趙雲), a general under Lau Bei

Lau Bei household
Rachel Kan as Lady Kon (甘夫人), Lau Bei's first wife
Iva Law as Lady Mei (麋夫人), Lau Bei's second wife
Annie Chong as Cho Kuk (鶵菊), a maid in Lau Bei's household
Doris Chow as a maid in Lau Bei's household
Siu Hoi-yan as a maid in Lau Bei's household
Lydia Law as a maid in Lau Bei's household
Cheung Wai-yi as a maid in Lau Bei's household
Tsang Yuen-sa

Cho Ngai (曹魏)

Law Lok-lam as Cho Cho (曹操), Prime Minister 
Ram Chiang as Sun Yuk (荀彧), Cho Cho's strategist
Chan Wing-kei as Kai Hui (賈詡), Cho Cho's strategist

Tung Ng (東吳)

Pierre Ngo as Suen Kuen (孫權), Tung Ng's head of state
Ruco Chan as Chow Yu (周瑜), a talented military general and strategist who serves the Suen family
Fung So-bor as Lady Ng (吳夫人), Suen Kuen's mother
Sharon Chan as Siu-kiu (小喬), Chow Yu's wife.

Lau Piu household
Mary Hon as Lady Choi (蔡夫人), Lau Biu's wife
Jack Wu as Lau Kei (劉琦), Lau Biu's older son
Vin Choi as Lau Chung (劉琮), Lau Biu's younger son

Others
Henry Lee
Man Yeung
Jonathan Cheung as Szema Shun's good friend
Lau Kong as Lau Biu
Kaki Leung as Wong Yuet-ying (黄月英), Chugot Leung's wife
Lee Yee-man as Hau-lin (巧蓮), Wong Yuet-ying's maid
Lee Chung-hei as Chui Ho (崔浩), Chugot Leung's friend
Bond Chan as Shek Kwong-Yuen (石廣元), Chugot Leung's friend
Jess Sum
Ha Yu as Szema Shun's father
Cilla Kung as Szema Kuen (司馬娟), Szema Shun's younger sister

Viewership ratings
The following is a table that includes a list of the total ratings points based on television viewership.

References

TVB dramas
Works based on Romance of the Three Kingdoms
Television series set in the Three Kingdoms
Hong Kong time travel television series
2012 Hong Kong television series debuts
2012 Hong Kong television series endings